Thomas Charles Pollard (7 July 1894 – 10 May 1941) was an Australian rules footballer who played with Collingwood and Essendon in the Victorian Football League (VFL).

Family
He married Marion Isabel Douglas on 25 June 1917.

Death
He died at Hamilton, New South Wales on 10 May 1941.

Notes

References
 
 Maplestone, M., Flying Higher: History of the Essendon Football Club 1872–1996, Essendon Football Club, (Melbourne), 1996.

External links 

 
 
 Tom Pollard's profile at Collingwood Forever.

1894 births
1941 deaths
Australian rules footballers from Victoria (Australia)
Collingwood Football Club players
Essendon Football Club players